Dinaria is a genus of harvestman in the family Travuniidae. There is one described species, Dinaria vjetrenicae. It has been found only in Vjetrenica Cave in southern Bosnia and Herzegovina.

References

Further reading

 
 
 

Harvestmen